Brad Johansen (born March 6, 1962) is the evening news anchor and reporter for WCMH-TV in Columbus, Ohio.

From 1996 to 2014, he was the sports director at WKRC-TV in Cincinnati, Ohio, where he was announcing Bengals pre-season games. In 2000, Brad moved to the radio booth, replacing Pete Arbogast, who is the voice of the USC Trojans' football and women's basketball programs, having held this position prior to calling the Bengals broadcasts.  On May 4, 2011 the Bengals announced that Dan Hoard was hired as the new Bengals radio play-by-play announcer replacing Brad Johansen. On July 6, The Bengals announced Johansen was hired to replace Paul Keels as the TV play-by-play announcer for Bengals preseason games.

In 2014, Johansen moved on from being the sports director and a play-by-play announcer for CBS Sports Network to anchoring the 4:00 and 5:30 pm newscasts at WKRC.

In April 2018, Johansen left WKRC-TV to join WRAL-TV in Raleigh, North Carolina as an evening news anchor and reporter. He was let go Thursday, April 4, 2019 after one year at the station.

On March 6, 2020, Johansen returned to television, as an early evening news anchor and reporter for WCMH-TV in Columbus.

External links
 Brad Johansen Biography
 Brad Johnansen :: WRAL.com

References

Living people
American radio sports announcers
American television sports announcers
Cincinnati Bengals announcers
College basketball announcers in the United States
College football announcers
National Football League announcers
Xavier Musketeers basketball
Place of birth missing (living people)
Television personalities from Cincinnati
1962 births